Brougham Place is a street lined with large mansions set in landscaped grounds in the Adelaide suburb of North Adelaide, South Australia. It surrounds Brougham Gardens, (Park 29 of the Adelaide Park Lands), that joins the three grids that comprise North Adelaide. It was named after Henry Brougham, 1st Baron Brougham and Vaux. He was a staunch supporter of the 1832 Reform Act and the passing of this Act led to the third and successful attempt to found a colony in SA in 1834.

Brougham Place starts and finishes at its intersection with LeFevre Terrace and Stanley Street and runs anti-clockwise around Brougham Gardens. Like other streets in the City of Adelaide with properties only along one side, numbering is sequential from 1 to 228.

Institutions and heritage listed buildings along Brougham Place include

Brougham Court
Brougham Court (formerly Bower Street) is located off Brougham Place between 95 and 96. It contains the national heritage Ebenezer Baptist Chapel, built in 1843 at 21-29, now a private dwelling

See also

References

Streets in Adelaide
North Adelaide